Catholicos Peter I Getadardz (? – died 1058) was the Catholicos of the Armenian Apostolic Church between 1019 and 1058. He was the brother of a former Catholicos Khachik I. He was the author of several works of sermons, anthems, and elegies on early Christian martyrs. 

He was surnamed Getadardz because he was said to have miraculously turned the current of a river toward its source. In later years Peter moved to Sebastia but later returned to Ani, at which point he was viewed with suspicious due to his long time away. He was induced to retire to Vaspurakan and remained shut up in a convent for four years in the early 1030s. The king appointed Deoskoros, abbot of Sanahin, as the new pontiff but the bishops would not recognize his authority. Deoskoros named a number of people described by historian Michael Chamich as "low" and "vile" to the priesthood and reinstated bishops who had been expelled for vices. This caused great disorder within the church and the clergy declared the king and other supporters of Deoskoros as anathema. To avoid this the king sent for Catholicos Peter to restore him to the pontifical chair. Deoskoros and those he appointed were defrocked.
In 1042 after an interregnum in Armenia an assembly of generals named Gagik II the new king who Peter crowned. Gagik was overthrown after three years by the Byzantines when they captured Ani. A new governor was sent to Ani form Greece and Catholicos Peter was exiled from the city. He was soon seized by order of the emperor and taken to Constantinople where Peter was given a residence to keep him away from Armenia. He was taken to Sebastia by one who had pledged to the emperor that the Catholicos would not escape and he lived there for five years in the convent of the Holy Cross. He was eventually able to return from Armenia and died at an advanced age after a reign of 40 years. His nephew was elected as Khachik II of Cilicia.

Catholicoi of Armenia
1058 deaths
Year of birth unknown
11th-century Armenian people
11th-century Oriental Orthodox archbishops